Pleasant Britton Tully (March 21, 1829 – March 24, 1897) was an American lawyer and politician who served one term as a U.S. Representative from California from 1883 to 1885.

Biography 
Born in Henderson County, Tennessee, Tully moved to Arkansas with his father, who settled in Phillips County in 1838. He attended public and private schools. He moved to California in 1853 and engaged in mining. He resided in Gilroy, California, after 1857. He studied law, and was admitted to the bar and practiced. He served as delegate at large to the State constitutional convention in 1879.

Congress 
Tully was elected as a Democrat to the Forty-eighth Congress (March 4, 1883 – March 3, 1885), after which he resumed the practice of law.

Death
He died in Gilroy, California, March 24, 1897, and was interred in the Masonic Cemetery.

References

1829 births
1897 deaths
Democratic Party members of the United States House of Representatives from California
People from Gilroy, California
People from Henderson County, Tennessee
People from Phillips County, Arkansas
19th-century American politicians